Ruelliopsis is a monotypic genus of flowering plants belonging to the family Acanthaceae. It only contains one known species, Ruelliopsis setosa (Nees) C.B.Clarke 

It is native to Zimbabwe, Botswana, Namibia and the Cape Provinces, Free State and the Northern Provinces, regions of South Africa.  
 
The genus name of Ruelliopsis is in honour of Jean Ruel (1474–1537), a French herbalist and physician to Francis I of France and translator of several works of Dioscorides.. The Latin specific epithet of setosa means bristly derived from setose. Both the genus and the species were first described and published in D.Oliver & auct. suc. (eds.), Fl. Trop. Afr. Vol.5 on page 59 in 1899.

References

Acanthaceae
Acanthaceae genera
Plants described in 1899
Flora of Zimbabwe
Flora of Southern Africa